Ted Savage (15 January 1887 – 2 March 1920) was a Canadian hurdler. He competed in the men's 110 metres hurdles at the 1908 Summer Olympics. He also was captain of the Montreal Football Club.

References

1887 births
1920 deaths
Athletes (track and field) at the 1908 Summer Olympics
Canadian male hurdlers
Olympic track and field athletes of Canada
Place of birth missing